The following list includes notable people who were born or have lived in Dover, New Hampshire.

Academics and writing 

 Kenneth Appel (1932–2013), mathematician; solved the four-color theorem
 Jeremy Belknap (1744–1798), clergyman, historian
 Lisa Crystal Carver (born 1968), writer, performance artist
 Matt Chandler, children's book author 
 Peter K. Hepler (born 1936), biologist
 Frank M. Rines (1892–1962), landscape artist, professor

Acting and modeling 

 Regan Hartley (born 1990), 2011 Miss New Hampshire
Mary Edna Hill Gray Dow (1848–1914), financier, school principal, correspondent

Architecture
Alvah T. Ramsdell (1852–1928), architect practicing in Dover from 1889–1928
Fred Wesley Wentworth (1864–1943), architect known for many buildings in downtown Paterson, New Jersey, and for the Lucius Varney House in Dover

Military 

 Joshua James Guppey (1820–1893), Union Army brigadier general during the Civil War
 John Hart (1706–1777), colonial militia officer 
 Dan Christie Kingman (1852–1916), U.S. Army brigadier general
 Joseph C. McConnell (1922–1954), United States Air Force fighter pilot who was the top American flying ace during the Korean War
 Hercules Mooney (1715–1800), officer, teacher during the Revolutionary War 
 Richard O'Kane (1911–1994), U.S. Navy rear admiral
 John Underhill (1597–1672), settler, colonial soldier
 George H. Wadleigh (1842–1927), U.S. Navy rear admiral

Music 

 Spencer Albee (born 1976), musician, singer, songwriter
 Nelson Bragg (born 1961), percussionist, vocalist, songwriter
 Tommy Makem (1932–2007), Irish folk musician with his sons The Makem Brothers
 Nellie Brown Mitchell (1845–1924), concert singer, music educator, "one of Boston's favorite cantatrices."

Politics and law 

 Frank Willey Clancy (1852–1928), Attorney General of New Mexico 
 Daniel Meserve Durell (1769–1841), U.S. congressman
 John P. Hale (1806–1873), U.S. senator
 William Hale (1765–1848), U.S. congressman
 Joshua G. Hall (1828–1898), U.S. congressman, state senator
 Maurice J. Murphy, Jr. (1927–2002), U.S. senator
 Marilla Ricker (1840–1920), suffragist, first woman to run for governor of New Hampshire
 Charles H. Sawyer (1840–1908), manufacturer and Governor of New Hampshire 
 Richard Waldron (1615–1689), businessman and the second President of New Hampshire 
 John Wentworth (1719–1781), judge, colonial leader
 John Wentworth, Jr. (1745–1787), Founding Father, lawyer, signatory of the Articles of Confederation
 Tappan Wentworth (1802–1875), U.S. congressman
 Timothy R. Young (1811–1898), U.S. congressman

Sports 

 Conor Casey (born 1981), Major League Soccer player for the Philadelphia Union 
 Dangerous Danny Davis (born 1956), former professional wrestling referee, wrestler
 Chip Kelly (born 1963), head coach for UCLA
 Cathy O'Brien (born 1967), Olympic long-distance runner
 Jessica Parratto (born 1994), Olympic medal-winning diver
 Ray Thomas (1910–1993), catcher for the Brooklyn Dodgers
 Jenny Thompson (born 1973), Olympic swimmer; won twelve medals including eight gold medals
 Dike Varney (1880–1950), pitcher for the Cleveland Bronchos

See also
Pine Hill Cemetery (Dover, New Hampshire)

References

Dover, New Hampshire
Dover